A port authority is a governmental or quasi-governmental body that operates ports and other transportation infrastructure.

Port Authority may also refer to:

 Port Authority (album), a 2007 album by hip hop producer Marco Polo
 Port Authority (film), a 2019 American film
 Port Authority (play), a 2001 play by Conor McPherson
 Port Authority Bus Terminal, the main terminal for interstate buses in New York City
 Ports Authority F.C., a professional football team in Freetown, Sierra Leone
 Port Authority of Allegheny County, the public transit authority in Pittsburgh
 Port Authority of New York and New Jersey, a two-state port district established in 1921

See also
Port (disambiguation)